The Western Junior is the oldest  national junior golf tournament in the United States. It was founded in 1914 and is organized by the Western Golf Association. It is played at a different course each year, primarily in the midwest. From 1914 to 1998, it was played with stroke play qualifying followed by a match play championship. Since 1999, it has been a 72-hole stroke play tournament.

The championship was first played in 1914 at Chicago Golf Club in Wheaton, Illinois and was won by Charles Grimes.

The Western Junior draws the top junior players from more than 40 states and internationally each year. The field is limited to 156 entrants. Exemptions into the Western Amateur are awarded to the top three finishers and ties. The tournament has been a testing ground for stars of the future, such as current PGA Tour stars Tiger Woods, Phil Mickelson, Hunter Mahan and Rickie Fowler, and veterans Fred Couples, Craig Stadler and Corey Pavin.

Winners

2021 Caleb Surratt
2020 No tournament
2019 Piercen Hunt
2018 Jeff Doty
2017 William Mouw
2016 Sean Maruyama
2015 Yu Chun-an
2014 K. K. Limbhasut
2013 Collin Morikawa
2012 Adam Wood
2011 Connor Black
2010 Patrick Rodgers
2009 Zack Fischer
2008 Cory Whitsett
2007 Cody Gribble
2006 Jhared Hack
2005 Rickie Fowler
2004 Jamie Lovemark
2003 Brady Schnell
2002 Brett Lange
2001 Jonathan Moore
2000 Buck Williams
1999 Hunter Mahan
1998 David Wagenseller
1997 Nick Cassini
1996 Andy Rapp
1995 James Driscoll
1994 Brad Elder
1993 Michael Jones
1992 John Curley
1991 Trip Kuehne
1990 Kelly Mitchum
1989 Craig Darling
1988 Chris Smith
1987 Jim Furyk
1986 Jon Worrell
1985 Don Edwards
1984 Steve LaMontagne
1983 Brad Meek
1982 Jim Benepe
1981 Gregg VonThaden
1980 Eugene Elliott
1979 Willie Wood
1978 Bobby Clampett
1977 Gary Wilks
1976 Gary Hallberg
1975 Britt Harrison
1974 Edwin Fisher, Jr.
1973 Tommy Jones
1972 Dennis Sullivan
1971 Richard Brooke
1970 Jeff Reaume
1969 Jim Simons
1968 Don Hawken
1967 Mike Goodart
1966 Ross Elder
1965 John Richart
1964 Jim Wiechers
1963 George Boutell
1962 George Shortridge
1961 Phil Marston
1960 Labron Harris Jr.
1959 Steve Spray
1958 Jack Rule, Jr.
1957 Don Essig III
1956 Dick Foote
1955 Gerald McFerren
1954 Herbert Klontz
1953 Henry Loeb
1952 Don Nichols
1951 Hillman Robbins
1950 Dean Lind
1949 Dean Lind
1948 Gene Coulter
1947 Tom Veech
1946 Mac Hunter
1943–45 No tournament
1942 William Witzleb
1941 Ben Downing
1940 Ben Downing
1939 Sam Kocsis
1938 Charles Betcher
1937 John Holmstrom
1936 Sid Richardson
1935 Fred Haas
1934 Fred Haas
1933 Frank Bredall
1932 John Banks
1931 Bob Cochran
1930 C. K. Collins
1929 Fred Lyon
1928 Dick Mullin
1927 Albert Hakes
1926 Sam Alpert
1925 Emerson Carey, Jr.
1924 Eldridge Robinson
1923 Ira Couch
1922 Kenneth Hisert
1921 Burton Mudge, Jr.
1920 Harold Martin
1919 Howard Sassman
1918 No tournament
1917 Frederick Wright
1916 John Simpson
1915 DeWitt Balch
1914 Charles Grimes

Source

References

External links

Western Golf Association

Junior golf tournaments
Amateur golf tournaments in the United States
Recurring sporting events established in 1914